The Tipperary Museum of Hidden History is a local history museum in Clonmel, County Tipperary, Ireland. It is a designated museum by the National Museum of Ireland and has full accreditation in the Museum Standards Programme for Ireland (MSPI).

History

A museum for Clonmel was founded in the 1940s. It opened on new premises on Mick Delahunty Square in 2000, and was renamed the South Tipperary County Museum soon after.

It was relaunched as the "Tipperary Museum of Hidden History" in October 2019 after a €500,000 upgrade.

The museum was closed during the COVID-19 pandemic; it marked its reopening in 2021 with a CD of lost Mick Delahunty music from 1948. In the same year, it received €15,000 in funding for the "Hidden Gems" exhibition.

Collection
The museum holds items and documents from the history of Clonmel and County Tipperary. Notable items include:
 Grangemockler shirt worn by Michael Hogan, footballer killed on Bloody Sunday (1920); it is not the shirt he was wearing when he was shot, however.
exhibitions on local sportspeople 
The ball used in the 1974 All-Ireland Senior Ladies' Football Championship Final
a death mask of Oliver Cromwell
items relating to musicians Frank Patterson, Mick Delahunty
The Carrick-on-Suir hoard, 81 gold coins (guineas and half guineas) dating from 1664 to 1701

Gallery

References

External links

Museums in County Tipperary
Tipperary
2000 establishments in Ireland
Museums established in 2000
Culture in County Tipperary
Buildings and structures in Clonmel